= Escuela Suiza de Barcelona =

Swiss international school in Spain

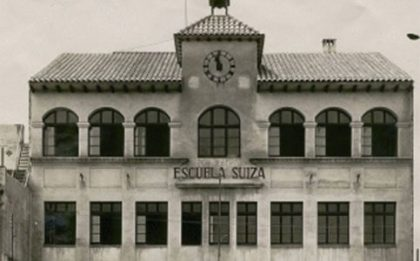
School in about 1920

Escuela Suiza de Barcelona (German: Schweizer Schule Barcelona, English: Swiss School of Barcelona) is a Swiss international school in Barcelona, Catalonia, Spain.

It was established in 1919. The school serves levels Vorkindergarten (preschool) until Sekundarstufe II (senior high school).
